Ranger Peak is a mountain peak on the border of the U.S. states of Idaho and Montana.

References

Mountains of Idaho